The 1999 Campionati Internazionali di Sicilia was a men's tennis tournaments played on outdoor clay courts in Palermo, Italy that was part of the World Series of the 1999 ATP Tour. It was the 21st edition of the tournament and was held from 4 October until 10 October 1999. Unseeded Arnaud di Pasquale won the singles title.

Finals

Singles

 Arnaud Di Pasquale defeated  Alberto Berasategui 6–1, 6–3
 It was di Pasquale's only singles title of his career.

Doubles

 Mariano Hood /  Sebastián Prieto defeated  Lan Bale /  Alberto Martín 6–3, 6–1

References

External links
 ITF tournament edition details

Campionati Internazionali di Sicilia
Campionati Internazionali di Sicilia
Campionati Internazionali di Sicilia